Anthias anthias, the swallowtail sea perch or marine goldfish, is a species of marine ray-finned fish from the grouper and sea bass family Serranidae. It is native to the eastern Atlantic Ocean and the Mediterranean Sea where it is associated with reefs. It is found in the aquarium trade.

Description
Anthias anthias has a rather deep body which has a standard length which is equivalent to 2.5 times its depth. The dorsal fin has 10 spines, with the third spine being especially long, and 15 soft rays. The anal fin has 3 spines and 7 soft rays. The pectoral fins are longer than the pelvic fins. The caudal fin has asymmetrical, pointed lobes with lower lobe being longer than the upper lobe. It has a complete lateral line which has 36-39 scales, the scales are large. Their colour varies from pink through to red and they have 3 yellow lines on the sides of their heads. Frequently they can show brown blotches along the back. The pelvic fins are yellow in colour but when breeding those of the males turn red.

Distribution
Anthias anthias is found in the eastern Atlantic Ocean and Mediterranean Sea. In the Eastern Atlantic it occurs from Portugal south to Angola and northern Namibia. It also occurs around the Azores, Madeira, Canary Islands and Cape Verde Islands and the islands in the Gulf of Guinea. It is widespread in the Mediterranean and has been recorded in the Canakkale Strait off Gallipoli but not in the Black Sea.

Habitat and biology
It emerges at night to feed on zooplankton, small crustacea and smaller fishes. This species is a protogynous hermaphrodite, all individuals hatch as females. Each time a male dies, one of the larger females changes her sex and becomes male. The majority are female throughout their lives and even a large school of these fish will contain only a few males. It takes around two weeks for the female to change sex and this involves not just a change in the gonads but also in colour, size and shape. If there are too many males in a social group then some of the males can reverse the sex change and revert to being females. They have been observed to co-operatively feed, some fish feed while others herd the prey, such as shrimp, the roles being reversed to allow all the fish to feed.

Species description and taxonomy
Anthias anthias was first formally described in 1758 as Labrus anthius by Carolus Linnaeus in Volume 1 of the Xth edition of the Systema Naturae with the type locality given as southern Europe. When Marcus Elieser Bloch created the genus Anthias he used Anthias sacer as the type species but this is regarded as a synonym of Linnaeus's Labrus anthias, so this species is the type species of its genus. The name anthias is Greek for a fish, probably the gilt-head bream.

Utilisation
Anthias anthias is used in the marine aquarium trade.

References

External links
 

anthias
Fish described in 1758
Taxa named by Carl Linnaeus